Edward Desmond Zimmerman (January 1, 1883 – May 6, 1945) was a professional baseball third baseman. He played in two seasons in Major League Baseball, for the St. Louis Cardinals in 1906 and the Brooklyn Dodgers in 1911.

Born in the Oceanic section of Rumson, New Jersey, Zimmerman attended Manhattan College.

Zimmerman had an extensive career in minor league baseball. He debuted in 1905 with the Toronto Maple Leafs, and played his final season in 1923 for the Pittsfield Hillies of the Eastern League.

External links

Major League Baseball third basemen
Brooklyn Dodgers players
St. Louis Cardinals players
Toronto Maple Leafs (International League) players
York Penn Parks players
Harrisburg Senators players
Newark Indians players
Baltimore Orioles (IL) players
Montreal Royals players
Springfield Hampdens players
Waterbury Brasscos players
Albany Senators players
Pittsfield Hillies players
Springfield Ponies players
Baseball players from New Jersey
Minor league baseball managers
People from Rumson, New Jersey
Sportspeople from Monmouth County, New Jersey
1883 births
1945 deaths
Shamokin (minor league baseball) players